Aleksandr Egorov (born 19 August 2001) is a Russian swimmer. He competed in the 2020 Summer Olympics.

References

2001 births
Living people
Swimmers from Moscow
People from Cheboksary
Swimmers at the 2020 Summer Olympics
Russian male swimmers
Olympic swimmers of Russia